Schwarzschild is  the German-derived surname borne by various individuals.

Schwarzschild also may refer to:
 Astronomical features:
 Schwarzschild (crater) on the Moon
 837 Schwarzschilda, asteroid 
 Institutions:
 Awardings of the Karl Schwarzschild Medal
 The Karl Schwarzschild Observatory

See also 
 List of entities named after scientist Karl Schwarzschild